Ian Basil Alston Allen (born 6 October 1965) is a former West Indian international cricketer who played in two Test matches in 1991.

Allen played for the Windward Islands, and his two Test matches came on the West Indies tour of England in 1991. He made his debut at Lord's against England as a replacement for Patrick Patterson. He took five wickets in total in his two Tests, his most important intervention coming at Trent Bridge when he ended a troublesome second-innings last-wicket stand by dismissing David Lawrence. The West Indies went onto win the match to draw level in the Test series, although Allen then lost his place when Patterson returned from injury.

After playing Allen was reported to be interested in the post of West Indies coach in 2007. Later he coached the Windward Islands.

References

1965 births
Living people
West Indies Test cricketers
Saint Vincent and the Grenadines cricketers
Windward Islands cricketers